The Breda Ba.201 was an Italian dive bomber designed during World War II, that never entered production.

Development
That the Regia Aeronautica struggled to develop an effective bomber force was surprising to all concerned, as in the pre-war period the Regia Aeronautica was highly rated and performed well during the Spanish Civil War and the Second Italo-Abyssinian War. But its performance in the first months of World War II was poor, even failing to subdue Malta with 1,000 bombers based less than 100 km (60 mi) away. One of the reasons was the lack of dive bombers and effective ground-attack aircraft; the Breda Ba.88 was a failure, and the Caproni Ca.310 was so ineffective that it was replaced by the Fiat CR.32 fighter-bomber. Another failure was the Savoia-Marchetti SM.85 dive bomber, phased out and replaced by the Junkers Ju 87 Stuka even before the evaluation of its successor the Savoia-Marchetti SM.86 was complete.

In 1939, a new contest for a dive bomber was called, requiring a single-engine aircraft with a maximum speed of 500 km/h (310 mph), or 450 km/h (280 mph) if twin-engined, capable of carrying 500 kg (1,100 lb) bombs, with an endurance of 1,200 km (750 mi) with a single engine, or 2,400 km (1,490 mi) with two engines. There was only one twin-engine proposal, the Piaggio P.122, which despite its all-metal construction, dorsal-wing airbrakes, two Piaggio P.XI R.C.40 engines giving a total of 1,491 kW (2,000 hp), and the lack of competitors, was considered unfit for service and was unbuilt.

Two single-engined types were proposed, the Caproni Ca.355, a single seat derivative of the Ca.335 light bomber that first flew in January 1941 and the Breda Ba.201.

Design
The Ba.201 was a single-engined cantilever monoplane of all-metal construction. It had inverted gull wings with split flaps that doubled as dive-brakes, and was fitted with a retractable tailwheel undercarriage. It had a long slim fuselage, with a low mounted tailplane. The cockpit was set as far forward as possible to give a good view for the pilot.

The dive capabilities were found to be satisfactory, and the air brakes were highly effective, perhaps too effective – with the risk of slowing the aircraft down so much it became too easy a target. It was capable of carrying a single 500 kg (1,100 lb) bomb and was armed with two 12.7 mm (.5 in) Breda-SAFAT machine guns fixed in the wings. After such engines as the 895 kW (1,200 hp) Fiat A.38, the 716 kW (960 hp) Isotta-Fraschini IF L.121, and the powerful 839 kW (1,125 hp) Isotta-Fraschini Zeta, were evaluated, the Daimler-Benz DB 601 engine was chosen, because it was compact, and allowed free dives thanks to its direct injection system.

The prototype first flew on 3 July 1941, and was then sent to Guidonia for official testing. The aircraft showed that it had enough agility, once freed of its bombload, to hold its own against other Italian fighters. However speed was disappointing, only 460 km/h (290 mph) – slower than the requested for 500 km/h (310 mph) – and slightly slower than older front-line fighters. The aircraft was barely capable of defending itself against enemy fighters, and then only after releasing its bomb. It had very good forward visibility, but rear visibility was poor.

In comparison, the Junkers Ju 87D had a top speed of only 410 km/h (260 mph), but was armed with two new 7.92 mm (.312 in) MG 81z machine guns, with 3,200 rounds per gun instead of 1,050. The Junkers rear-gunner gave it a greater defensive capability, while the Ba.201 pilot relied on himself alone. The Reggiane Re.2001 fighter bomber fitted with the same DB 601 engine was able to reach almost 550 km/h (342 mph), and carry 640 kg (1,411 lb) bombs.

The first prototype MM.451 was followed by only one other before the programme was cancelled.

Specifications (Ba.201)

See also

References

 Francillon, René J. "Tuffatore: Breda Ba.201 – Italy's would-be dive bomber". Air International, March 1995, Vol 48 No 3. pp. 142–143. ISSN 0306-5634.
Lembo, Daniele I tuffatori della Regia Aereonautica Aerei nella Storia n.8.

External links

 1000 Aircraft Photos
 Great Planes forum
 Ba.201 
 Ba.201 

Ba.201
1940s Italian bomber aircraft
World War II medium bombers
World War II Italian bombers
Inverted gull-wing aircraft
Abandoned military aircraft projects of Italy
Low-wing aircraft
Single-engined tractor aircraft
Aircraft first flown in 1941